Shahin-e Olya (also Romanized as Shāhīn-e ‘Olyā; also known as Shāhīn-e Bālā and Kalāt Shahnī) is a village in Soleyman Rural District, Soleyman District, Zaveh County, Razavi Khorasan Province, Iran. At the 2006 census, its population was 1,297, in 274 families.

References 

Populated places in Zaveh County